Paul Landres (August 12, 1912–December 26, 2001) was an American film and television editor and director. He directed episodes of The Lone Ranger, Maverick and Flipper, among many other TV series.

He directed the vampire film The Return of Dracula (1958) based on Pat Fiedler's script and starring Ray Stricklyn, Virginia Vincent, John Wengraf, Gage Clarke, Jimmy Baird and Greta Granstedt. He met actor Arthur Franz and actress Kathleen Crowley and both appeared in The Flame Barrier (1958).

He directed western films such as Son of a Gunfighter (1965) with Russ Tamblyn in the title role, and Oregon Passage (1957) starring John Ericson, Lola Albright, Toni Gerry, Edward Platt, and H.M. Wynant; and western television series such as The Lone Ranger, The Cisco Kid, The Life and Legend of Wyatt Earp, Bonanza, and Maverick.

Filmography
His feature films include:
 Prescription for Romance (1937)
 The Road to Reno (1938)
 Destiny (1944)
 Senorita from the West (1945)
 The Daltons Ride Again (1945)
 Navy Bound (1951)
 Army Bound (1952)
 Last of the Badmen (1957)
 The Vampire (1957)
 Oregon Passage (1957)
 The Return of Dracula (1958)
 The Flame Barrier (1958)
 Johnny Rocco (1958)
 Lone Texan (1959)
 Go, Johnny Go! (1959)
 The Miracle of the Hills'' (1959)

References

External links

2001 deaths
1912 births
American film directors
American television directors
American film editors
American television editors
Place of birth missing